List of all members of Stortinget in the period 1993 to 1997.  The list includes all who were elected.

There were a total of 165 representatives, distributed among 67 to the Norwegian Labour Party,
32 to Centre Party, 28 to Conservative Party,
13 to Socialist Left Party, 13 to Christian Democrats,
10 to Progress Party (Norway),  and 
1 to Red Electoral Alliance.

Eight leveling seats were shared among Akershus (2), Buskerud (1), Oslo (2), Rogaland (1) and Telemark (2).

Aust-Agder

Vest-Agder

Akershus

2 leveling seats.

Buskerud

1 leveling seat.

Finnmark

Hedmark

Hordaland

Møre og Romsdal

Nordland

Oppland

Oslo

2 leveling seats.

Rogaland

1 leveling seat.

Sogn and Fjordane

Telemark

2 leveling seats.

Troms

Nord-Trøndelag

Sør-Trøndelag

Vestfold

Østfold

 

 
Parliament of Norway, 1993–97